Tholera decimalis, the feathered Gothic, is a species of moth of the family Noctuidae. It is found in Europe and Scandinavia then through the Palearctic to Asia minor, western Central Asia, southern Siberia and in North Africa.

Technical description and variation

The wingspan is 38–48 mm. Forewing olive fuscous tinged with purple;all the veins white; inner and outer lines double, black; submarginal whitish, preceded by black wedgeshaped spots; claviform stigma of the ground colour outlined with whitish and black and with a pale linear centre; upper stigmata white-ringed with olive centres, reniform with a curved pale line at centre; wing in male dull white with fuscous termen, in female wholly fuscous with base alone paler; — ab. hilaris Stgr. is smaller and paler, the hindwing of male whitish.

Biology
The moth flies from August to September depending on the location.

Larva shining bronzy brownish, with the tubercles large and black; head and thoracic plate dark brown. Younger caterpillars are initially greenish coloured and change their colour with increasing development of shiny brownish tints. The dorsal and laterodorsal lines are yellow-brown. The larvae feed at the roots of various grasses, living through the winter and feeding up in summer.
.

Steppe, grassy hillsides, gardens and meadows and pastures are the main habitat.

References

External links

Feathered Gothic at UKmoths
Funet Taxonomy
Lepiforum.de
Vlindernet.nl 

Hadenini
Moths of Europe
Moths of Asia
Moths described in 1761